Peraia (before 1927: Κότσανα, Kotsana) is a village in the Pella regional unit of Macedonia, Greece on the bank of Lake Vegoritida. The village is located south of the town of Arnissa within the Vegoritida municipal unit which belongs to the municipality of Edessa.

Demographics
The village was formerly inhabited by a Turkish-speaking Muslim population. 

The Greek census (1920) recorded 1404 people in the village and in 1923 there were 1300 who were Muslim. Following the Greek-Turkish population exchange, in 1926 within Kotsana there were 203 refugee families from Asia Minor. The Greek census (1928) recorded 586 village inhabitants. There were 136 refugee families (588 people) in 1928. The Greek refugees came from the following locations in Asia Minor including Kuri, Peladari, Tsanakalai, Appoloniatha as well as Armenia.  

The current population is estimated at 400.

References

Populated places in Pella (regional unit)
Edessa, Greece